Plainfield Central Fire Headquarters is located in Plainfield, Union County, New Jersey, United States. The firehouse was built in 1926 and added to the National Register of Historic Places on March 4, 1993.

See also
National Register of Historic Places listings in Union County, New Jersey

References

External links
Plainfield Department of Public Affairs and Safety (Fire Division)

Fire stations completed in 1926
Buildings and structures in Union County, New Jersey
Fire stations on the National Register of Historic Places in New Jersey
National Register of Historic Places in Union County, New Jersey
Plainfield, New Jersey
New Jersey Register of Historic Places